Ricardo Hizon (born 1921, date of death unknown) was a Filipino former sports shooter. He competed in the 50 metre pistol event at the 1956 Summer Olympics.

References

External links
 

1921 births
Year of death missing
Filipino male sport shooters
Olympic shooters of the Philippines
Shooters at the 1956 Summer Olympics
Place of birth missing